The Warcop Training Area (WTA) is a UK Ministry of Defence military training area near the village of Warcop in Cumbria.

History

The training estate was established in 1942 originally as a tank gunnery range and tanks still use it to this day.

On 19 October 1944 a Short Stirling bomber (LK 488), crashed on Mickle Fell whilst on a training flight from its base at RAF Wratting Common in Cambridgeshire; of the seven crew, only one survived.

On 22 April 1999 a soldier died when a grenade exploded in his pocket.

On 4 June 2014, one soldier died and two others were injured in a training accident when a military vehicle rolled over.

Coverage of the training area
Within the training area are Little Fell (745m) and Mickle Fell (790m), Burton Fell, Warcop Fell, Cronkley Fell and part of Murton Fell.

Most of the training area is in Cumbria but a portion is  County Durham. The area forms part of the North Pennines Area of Outstanding Natural Beauty and about two-thirds of the area falls inside the Appleby Fells Site of Special Scientific Interest.

Army use
Warcop Training Area is used six and a half days a week by the Infantry Training Centre at Catterick Garrison, other regular British Army and Army Reserves using the Warcop Training Camp. The camp also has its own assault course and zip line.

References

Training establishments of the British Army
Geography of Cumbria
Sites of Special Scientific Interest in Cumbria
Installations of the British Army
Murton, Cumbria